Nordic combined at the 1972 Winter Olympics consisted of one event, held from 4 February to 5 February. The ski jumping portion took place at Miyanomori Ski Jump Stadium, while the cross-country portion took place at Makomanai Park.

Medal summary

Medal table

Events

Individual

Athletes did three normal hill ski jumps, with the lowest score dropped. They then raced a 15 kilometre cross-country course, with the time converted to points. The athlete with the highest combined points score was awarded the gold medal.

Participating NOCs
Fourteen nations participated in nordic combined at the Sapporo Games.

References

External links
 Sports-Reference - 1972 Olympics - Nordic Combined - Individual

 
1972 Winter Olympics events
1972
1972 in Nordic combined
Nordic combined competitions in Japan
Men's events at the 1972 Winter Olympics